Edmund Cooper (September 11, 1821 – July 21, 1911) was a U.S. Representative from Tennessee.

Biography
Cooper was born in Franklin, Tennessee. He was the brother of Henry Cooper. Cooper graduated from Jackson (Tennessee) College in 1839.
He studied law at Harvard University.
He was admitted to the bar and commenced practice in Shelbyville, Tennessee, in 1841.
He served as member of the State house of representatives in 1849.
He served as presidential elector on the Constitutional Union ticket in 1860.
Union delegate to the State constitutional convention of 1861.

Cooper was again elected to the State house of representatives but in 1865 resigned.
Upon the readmission of the State of Tennessee to representation Cooper was elected as a Unionist to the Thirty-ninth Congress and served from July 24, 1866, to March 3, 1867.
He was an unsuccessful candidate for reelection to the Fortieth Congress.
He was appointed by President Johnson Assistant Secretary of the Treasury November 20, 1867, and served until March 20, 1869.
He resumed the practice of law at Shelbyville and died there July 21, 1911.
He was interred in Willow Mount Cemetery.

Sources

1821 births
1911 deaths
People from Franklin, Tennessee
Tennessee Constitutional Unionists
Tennessee Unionists
Unionist Party members of the United States House of Representatives from Tennessee
People of Tennessee in the American Civil War
Harvard Law School alumni
19th-century American politicians
Members of the United States House of Representatives from Tennessee